Ove Hansen (born 27 April 1957) is a Norwegian equestrian. He competed at the 1984 Summer Olympics and the 1988 Summer Olympics.

References

External links
 

1957 births
Living people
Norwegian male equestrians
Olympic equestrians of Norway
Equestrians at the 1984 Summer Olympics
Equestrians at the 1988 Summer Olympics
People from Haugesund
Sportspeople from Rogaland